Wayman Miner (1894 – November 11, 1918) was an American soldier who fought in the Buffalo Soldier regiment during the First World War. He died in the hours between the signing of the Armistice and the symbolic 11 a.m. time it was set to go into effect, after volunteering for a mission to carry ammunition to a machine gun nest.

Early life 
Wayman "Wayne" Miner was born to Emily and Ned Minor, formerly enslaved people, on August 17, 1894. He married Belle Carter between 1910 and 1918.

Service 
Miner registered for the army in Kansas City on October 26, 1917.

Death 
On November 11, 1918, Miner volunteered alongside three other soldiers to supply ammunition to a machine gun nest which was under fire. Miner died carrying out that mission, reportedly from shrapnel. His death came after the Armistice was signed but before it went into effect, as the cession of fighting was delayed six hours to coincide with "the eleventh hour of the eleventh day of the eleventh month."

Miner was buried in the St. Mihiel American Cemetery in Thiaucourt, France.

Dedications and media 
The Wayne Miner American Legion Post 149—dedicated to Miner—is the second-oldest African-American legion in the nation, with over one-hundred members. Miner also gave his name to the Wayne Miner Community Center and the Wayne Minor Court housing project, which was demolished in 1987.

References 

1894 births
1918 deaths
United States Army personnel of World War I
American military personnel killed in World War I
Buffalo Soldiers
African Americans in World War I
African-American United States Army personnel